Kevin Dean Chan-Yu-Tin (born 11 July 1990) is a Mauritian former footballer who plays as a midfielder.

International
Chan has been involved at youth level making an appearance for the Canada U-17 National Team at the 2006 CFU Youth Cup. He had also made appearances for the Quebec Provincial side, playing in both National and International tournaments.

Chan-Yu-Tin is eligible to play for Mauritius through his parents. In April 2016, Chan received a call up to the Mauritius national football team for their 2017 Africa Cup of Nations qualifier against Ghana, making an appearance as a substitute. He would make an additional two appearances, including one start in the 2016 COSAFA Cup.

References

External links

Syracuse men's soccer profile

1990 births
Living people
Soccer players from Montreal
Mauritian footballers
Mauritius international footballers
Canadian soccer players
Canadian people of Mauritian descent
Association football midfielders
Mauritian expatriate footballers
Canadian expatriate soccer players
Canadian expatriates in the United States
Expatriate soccer players in the United States
Expatriate footballers in Taiwan
Syracuse Orange men's soccer players
Taiwan Power Company F.C. players
Première ligue de soccer du Québec players
FC Brossard players
Lakeshore SC players
A.S. Blainville players
CS Mont-Royal Outremont players